"Photograph" is a song by the English rock band Def Leppard and produced by Robert John "Mutt" Lange. It is the lead single from the band's third studio album, Pyromania (1983). Their lead vocalist Joe Elliott has described the song as generally about "something you can't ever get your hands on". When released as a single it reached No. 1 on the Billboard Top Tracks chart, where it stayed for six weeks, and No. 12 on the Pop Singles chart.

In 2008, they performed the song with Taylor Swift on CMT Crossroads. The performance was nominated for both Wide Open Country Video of the Year and CMT Performance of the Year at the 2009 CMT Music Awards.

In 2013, the song was featured in the Grand Theft Auto V video game, on the Los Santos Rock Radio station. It was also featured in the DLC release of Rock Band 3, in 2011.

Musical style
The song has been described as pop metal, glam metal, hard rock and power pop.

Reception
Cash Box called it "a well-crafted if typical hard-pop outing," praising the "incendiary metal guitar licks and deafening drumbeats."

Music video
There are two slightly different versions of the music video. The uncensored version shows a knife scene at the beginning, and on the censored version of the video, it is almost the same except the knife scene is replaced with a stationary black cat among other minor bits removed. There are several appearances of a lookalike impersonating Marilyn Monroe in the video, for the song is actually about the star and lead singer Joe Elliott's declaration that he does not just "want [her] photograph" but that is all he has of her, and he must admire her from afar.

The music video was directed by David Mallet and was shot on 2 December 1982 (bassist Rick Savage's 22nd birthday), in Battersea, London, England. It featured the video debut of their co-lead guitarist Phil Collen. The video aired in heavy rotation on MTV.

Live performances
"Photograph" has been performed at every Def Leppard concert tour since its release. The song is traditionally the final song of the concert, often used during the encore (as well as fellow Pyromania track "Rock of Ages"). During these performances, Elliott attempts to rile the crowd into singing along by saying "Come on, sing it" before the first chorus. "Photograph", however, is harsh on the singer's vocals (especially as time wears on) due to the song's high notes.

Legacy
"Photograph" is widely considered one of Def Leppard's best songs and one of the best rock songs of all time. In 2009 it was named the 13th-greatest hard rock song of all time by VH1. It was also listed as the 17th-greatest song of the past 25 years by VH1. In 2015, Loudwire ranked the song number one on their list of the 10 greatest Def Leppard songs, and in 2017, Billboard placed it number two on their list of the 15 best Def Leppard songs.

Personnel 
Joe Elliott – lead vocals
Phil Collen – guitar solo, backing vocals
Steve Clark – lead guitar
Pete Willis – rhythm guitar
Rick Savage – bass guitar, backing vocals 
Rick Allen – drums
Thomas Dolby – keyboards

Charts
Original version

Weekly charts

Year-end charts

Santana featuring Chris Daughtry

See also 
List of number-one mainstream rock hits (United States)
List of glam metal albums and songs

References 

Songs about Marilyn Monroe
Def Leppard songs
1983 singles
Songs written by Robert John "Mutt" Lange
Song recordings produced by Robert John "Mutt" Lange
Santana (band) songs
Daughtry (band) songs
2011 singles
1982 songs
Songs written by Steve Clark
Songs written by Pete Willis
Songs written by Joe Elliott
Songs written by Rick Savage
British power pop songs
Mercury Records singles
Music videos directed by David Mallet (director)